Noisy Neighbors is a 1929 American comedy film directed by Charles Reisner and starring Eddie Quillan, Alberta Vaughn and Jane Keckley.

Cast
 Eddie Quillan as Eddie Van Revel
 Alberta Vaughn as Mary Carstairs
 Jane Keckley as Mother
 Joseph Quillan as Brother
 Marie Quillan as Sister
 Theodore Roberts as Colonel Carstairs
 Ray Hallor as David
 Russell Simpson as Ebenezer
 Bob Perry as First Son
 Mike Donlin as Second Son
 Billy Gilbert as Third Son

Production
The film contains only about 5 minutes of dialog, despite being billed as a "talkie".

References

Bibliography
 Fleming, E.J. Paul Bern: The Life and Famous Death of the MGM Director and Husband of Harlow. McFarland, 2009.

External links
 

1929 films
1929 comedy films
1920s English-language films
American comedy films
Films directed by Charles Reisner
American black-and-white films
Pathé Exchange films
Films with screenplays by F. Hugh Herbert
1920s American films